Natalya Misyulya (maiden name Dmitrachenka; born April 16, 1966) is a retired female race walker from Belarus. She competed in two consecutive Summer Olympics for her native country: 1996 and 2000.

She is married with race walker Yevgeniy Misyulya.

International competitions

References
 
sports-reference

1966 births
Living people
Belarusian female racewalkers
Olympic athletes of Belarus
Athletes (track and field) at the 1996 Summer Olympics
Athletes (track and field) at the 2000 Summer Olympics
World Athletics Championships athletes for Belarus